Faraulep Atoll is a coral atoll of three islands in the central Caroline Islands in the Pacific Ocean, and forms a legislative district in Yap State in the Federated States of Micronesia. 

The population of Faraulep was 221 in 2000.

The first recorded sighting of Faraulep Atoll by Europeans was by a Spanish ship sailing from Manila piloted by Juan Rodríguez in 1696.

As with all of the Caroline Islands, they were sold by Spain to the Empire of Germany in 1899. The island came under the control of the Empire of Japan after World War I, and was subsequently administered under the South Seas Mandate. Following World War II, the island came under the control of the United States of America and was administered as part of the Trust Territory of the Pacific Islands from 1947, and became part of the Federated States of Micronesia from 1979.

References
 Columbia Gazetteer of the World. Vol. 1, p. 900

External links

Islands of Yap
Municipalities of Yap
Atolls of the Federated States of Micronesia